The 1912 Illinois gubernatorial election was held on November 5, 1912. Incumbent second-term Republican governor Charles S. Deneen was defeated by Democratic nominee, former mayor of Chicago Edward Fitzsimmons Dunne. 

Dunne was the first Democratic Governor of Illinois elected since 1892 and only the second since 1852. As of  this is the first and only time that a former mayor of Chicago (Illinois’ largest city) was elected governor of Illinois.

Primary elections
Primary elections were held on April 9, 1912.

Democratic primary

Candidates
Samuel Alschuler, former State Representative
Ben F. Caldwell, former U.S. Representative for the 21st district
George E. Dickson
Edward F. Dunne, former mayor of Chicago

Results

Republican primary

Candidates
John J. Brown
Charles S. Deneen, incumbent Governor
Charles F. Hurburgh, State Senator
Walter C. Jones, State Senator
J. McCan Davis, Clerk of the Supreme Court of Illinois
Len Small, former treasurer
John E. W. Wayman, Cook County State's attorney
Richard Yates Jr., former governor

Results

Prohibition primary

Candidates
Edwin R. Worrell, Presbyterian minister

Results

Socialist primary

Candidates
John C. Kennedy

Results

General election

Candidates
Charles S. Deneen, Republican
Edward F. Dunne, Democratic
John M. Francis, Socialist Labor, perennial candidate
Frank H. Funk, Progressives for S.J., former State Senator
John C. Kennedy, Socialist
Edwin R. Worrell, Prohibition

Results

See also
1912 Illinois lieutenant gubernatorial election

References

Bibliography

1912
Illinois
Gubernatorial
November 1912 events in the United States